

Qualification rules
A nation may earn up to 1 boat in each of the 9 Sailing events.

Qualification Timeline

Summary
Qualification is official as of March 10, 2011 from the Pan American sailing website.

Men's Sailboard

Unused quota spot transferred to the women's laser radial.

Men's Laser

Women's Sailboard

Women's Laser Radial

Open Sunfish

Open Snipe

Open Lightning

Open Hobie 16

Open J/24

References

2009 in sailing
2010 in sailing
sailing
Qual